Selargius, Ceràrgius or Ceraxius in Sardinian, is a comune (municipality) in the Metropolitan City of Cagliari in the Italian region Sardinia, located about  northeast of Cagliari. , it has a population of 28,905.

The village exists since the Middle Ages as part of the Cagliari Campidanu part of the Giudicato of Cagliari. In 1928 it was merged by the Cagliari commune but gained again its autonomy in 1947, after a local referendum. Selargius is part of the Cagliari metropolitan area.

Selargius borders the following municipalities: Cagliari, Monserrato, Quartu Sant'Elena, Quartucciu, Sestu, Settimo San Pietro.

See also
Molentargius - Saline Regional Park

References

External links
Official website

Cities and towns in Sardinia
Geography of Cagliari
1947 establishments in Italy
States and territories established in 1947
States and territories disestablished in 1928